Beniami Borbandi is a Romanian sprint canoer who competed in the late 1970s. He won a silver medal in the K-4 500 m event at the 1977 ICF Canoe Sprint World Championships in Sofia.

References

Living people
Romanian male canoeists
Year of birth missing (living people)
ICF Canoe Sprint World Championships medalists in kayak